There are a number of shipyard cranes called Goliath around the world:
 Goliath (Mangalia), in Romania
 Samson and Goliath (cranes) in Northern Ireland
 Goliath (Rosyth) in Scotland
 Two Goliath cranes, Reliance Shipyard, Pipavav, India